The 7th European Athletics Championships were held from 12–16 September 1962 in the JNA Stadium in Belgrade, Yugoslavia (present-day Serbia).  Contemporaneous reports on the event were given in the Glasgow Herald. Just before the meet, the IAAF council approved the use glass fibre poles for pole vaulting.  As a consequence, competitors were able to use them during the meet if they wished.

Medal summary
Complete results were published.

Men

 Igor Ter-Ovanesyan's championship record of 7.81 metres, set at the previous edition in 1958, was bettered by all the medalling athletes in 1962. Ter-Ovanesyan's winning jump of 8.19 metres was wind-assisted – although Finns Rainer Stenius and Pentti Eskola cleared 7.85 m, Ter-Ovanesyan's non-wind-assisted jump of 7.82 m in qualification round (13 September) and Ter-Ovanesyan's best non-wind-assisted jump of 7.87 m in final (14 September) were ratified as the new championship marks.

Women

 The women's 100 metres silver medallist Jutta Heine bettered the championship record twice in qualifying, running 11.5, then 11.4 seconds. Both times were ratified as championship records. In the final Dorothy Hyman and Heine ran 11.3 but this was wind-assisted.

Medal table

Participation
According to an unofficial count, 668 athletes from 29 countries participated in the event, two athletes less than the official number of 670 as published.  There was a joint German team comprising athletes from both East and West Germany.  Assignment to their respective country was accomplished using the database of Deutsche Gesellschaft für Leichtathletik-Dokumentation 1990 e.V.

 (9)
 (11)
 (21)
 (25)
 (4)
 (29)
 (42)
 (96)
 (50)
 (46)
 (11)
 (40)
 (4)
 (4)
 (36)
 (2)
 (3)
 (1)
 (8)
 (14)
 (50)
 (3)
 (18)
 (74)
 (6)
 (18)
 (16)
 (11)
 (74)
 (38)

References

Results

External links
 European Athletics
 Athletix

 
European Athletics Championships
European Athletics Championships
European Athletics Championships
International athletics competitions hosted by Yugoslavia
1962 in European sport
International sports competitions in Belgrade
September 1962 sports events in Europe
1960s in Belgrade
1962 in Serbia